The Vernons is an Australia blues rock formed on the Gold Coast, Queensland in 2011.

History
The Vernons formed in 2011 when James Nikiforides asked Jonny Nyst to join a band he had put together with Elliot Gooch and Andrew Lahey.  Lahey left the band in 2012 and was replaced by Hugh Tait; while Gooch left in 2014 and the band has since been working with guest musicians in his place.

The band's debut EP, Volume I was released in 2013, was produced by Yanto Browning (The Medics, Art of Sleeping, Mosman Alder) and its first single, "Standing in Line", reached the top of the iTunes Blues chart.  Second single, "White Wine", spawned a noteworthy video which quietly generated 200,000 views on YouTube. "Shake 'n' Roll" from the EP was later featured in a T-Mobile advertising campaign in the United States.

Volume II, released in 2014, was produced by Musicians Hall of Famer, Louie Shelton, who has worked with a stunning array of artists (Michael Jackson, Seals and Crofts, The Wolverines among them). "To the Sky" from this EP won the Queensland Music Award for Best Regional Song.

Produced by Konstantin Kersting (Moses Gunn Collective, Belligerents, Junkyard Diamonds), "Snap My Fingers", the first single from a third EP, Snap, was released 7 August 2015 and a follow-up, "Keep On Dreaming", launched 6 November 2015, the same day the EP became available.

In addition to successful headline tours behind the band's single and EP releases, The Vernons have supported other acts across the genres, sharing the stage with Wolfmother, Seasick Steve, The Rubens, Wolf & Cub, Hoodoo Gurus, Stonefield and Ash Grunwald.  The band also played major Australian festival, Big Day Out.

Discography

Extended plays

Singles

Awards

Queensland Music Awards
The Queensland Music Awards (previously known as Q Song Awards) are annual awards celebrating Queensland, Australia's brightest emerging artists and established legends. They commenced in 2006.
 
|-
| 2015
| "To the Sky"
| Regional Song of the Year
| 
|-

References

Australian blues rock groups
Musical groups established in 2011
Queensland musical groups
2011 establishments in Australia